Michel Vanderbauwhede (19 May 1901, Boezinge - 3 July 1977, Ypres) was a Belgian football player. He was a striker.

Vanderbauwhede made his debut at the highest level of Belgian football in 1920. He played with Cercle Brugge in an away win against AA Gent. With Cercle, he also won the league twice (1927, 1930) and the cup once (1927).

With his 109 goals in 231 appearances, Vanderbauwhede is the 4th best goal scorer in the history of Cercle Brugge.

Michel Vanderbauwhede also played 15 times for Belgium. He made his debut on 11 April 1926, in an away match against France. Belgium lost 4–3. Vanderbauwhede scored his first of seven international goals in this match.

References

External links
Cerclemuseum.be 

1901 births
1977 deaths
Sportspeople from Ypres
Footballers from West Flanders
Belgian footballers
Belgium international footballers
Association football forwards
Cercle Brugge K.S.V. players
Belgian Pro League players